In Greek mythology, Idmon (Ancient Greek: Ἴδμων means "having knowledge of" or "the knowing") may refer to the following individuals:

Idmon, one of the fifty sons of Aegyptus, who married and was killed by the Danaid Pylarge.
 Idmon, father of Arachne, and perhaps her brother Phalanx too.
Idmon, an Argonaut seer and son of Apollo or Abas.
 Idmon, herald of Turnus.
 Idmon, a figure briefly mentioned in Statius' Thebaid. He came from Epidaurus and was portrayed in the poem cleansing Tydeus' wounds after a battle.

Notes

References
 Apollodorus, Apollodorus, The Library, with an English Translation by Sir James George Frazer, F.B.A., F.R.S. in 2 Volumes. Cambridge, Massachusetts, Harvard University Press; London, William Heinemann Ltd. 1921. Online version at the Perseus Digital Library.
Vergil, Aeneid. Theodore C. Williams. trans. Boston. Houghton Mifflin Co. 1910. Online version at the Perseus Digital Library.
Statius, The Thebaid translated by John Henry Mozley. Loeb Classical Library Volumes. Cambridge, MA, Harvard University Press; London, William Heinemann Ltd. 1928.  Online version at the Topos Text Project.
Grimal, Pierre. Entry for Idmon.  The Dictionary of Classical Mythology.  Blackwell, 1986.  .
Seaton, R.C. (editor and translator). Apollonius Rhodius: Argonautica. Cambridge, Massachusetts: Harvard University Press, 1912.
William Smith, Dictionary of Greek and Roman Biography and Mythology, v. 2, page 562, under Idmon

Sons of Aegyptus
Argonauts
Metamorphoses characters
Characters in the Argonautica